KMFX may refer to:

 KMFX-FM, a radio station (102.5 FM) licensed to Lake City, Minnesota, United States
 WBHA, a radio station (1190 AM) licensed to Wabasha, Minnesota, United States, which used the call sign KMFX from 1994 to 2011